Mühlberg is a town in the Elbe-Elster district, in the southwesternmost part of Brandenburg, Germany. It is located on the right bank of the river Elbe, about halfway between Riesa to the south and Torgau to the northwest. It is about 60 km east of Leipzig. It is accessed by the Bundesstraße 182 (Riesa - Torgau - Wittenberg) on the left bank of the Elbe, connected with the town by a bridge, opened in 2008. Mühlberg consists of the Ortsteile Mühlberg, Altenau, Brottewitz, Fichtenberg, Koßdorf and Martinskirchen.

History
The earliest documentary mention of Mühlberg is in 1230. The town was founded on a sandy island where the River Elbe could be crossed under protection of a castle. There is archaeological evidence, in the form of burials, of Slavic settlement dating back to ca. 600 A.D. During the middle ages lordship over the city shifted several times between the Bohemian noble family of the House of Berka of Dubá and the House of Wettin. The forces of Charles V, Holy Roman Emperor defeated the Schmalkaldic League at the Battle of Mühlberg near the castle on April 24, 1547. From 1939 to 1945 there existed a World War II prisoner-of-war camp (Stalag IV-B) near Mühlberg. About 300,000 prisoners passed the camp and about 3000, most of them Soviet soldiers, died there. After World War II the camp was re-used by the Soviet secret service NKVD as NKVD Special Camp No. 1. About 6,700 of the 22,000 prisoners of the NKVD are buried in mass graves near the camp area. Today a memorial area remembers on the victims of both camp periods. From 1952 to 1990, Mühlberg was part of the Bezirk Cottbus of East Germany.

Demography

Sites of interest
Marienstern Abbey
Castle
Historic town centre of Mühlberg
Museum dedicated to the battle that took place in 1547.

Personalities 

 Wilhelm Hasemann (1850-1913), Black Forest painter
 Werner Kube (1924-1945), resistance fighter, shot 1945 in Brottewitz

References

External links

 
 
 Website on the history of POW camp Stalag IVb and Soviet special camp No.1 near Mühlberg

 
Localities in Elbe-Elster